Dieckol is a phlorotannin that can be found in arame (Eisenia bicyclis), in Ecklonia cava or in Ecklonia stolonifera.

This compound shows antithrombotic and profibrinolytic activities. It has also an effect on hair growth.

See also 
 Procyanidin B3, a proanthocyanidin dimer with the same hair growth-promoting effect

References 

Phlorotannin dimers